The 7th Air Wing is a wing of the Japan Air Self-Defense Force. It comes under the authority of the Central Air Defense Force. It is based at Hyakuri Air Base in Ibaraki Prefecture.

As of 2019 it has one squadron, equipped with Mitsubishi F-2 and Kawasaki T-4 aircraft:
 3rd Tactical Fighter Squadron

Gallery

See also
 Fighter units of the Japan Air Self-Defense Force

References

Units of the Japan Air Self-Defense Force